The Parasol Unit Foundation for Contemporary Art is an educational charity and a not-for-profit contemporary art gallery based in London. Established in 2004, the foundation is housed in a converted warehouse over two floors in a building that was renovated to a design concept by the Italian architect, Claudio Silvestrin. The gallery comprises roughly 5,000 sq ft (460 m2) of exhibition space.

Parasol Unit was established by its director and curator, Ziba Ardalan. A graduate in the History of Art from Columbia University New York, Ardalan worked as Guest Curator at the Whitney Museum of American Art. She guest curated the exhibition 'Winslow Homer and the New England Coast' at the Whitney's Stamford, Ct. Branch (1984). Ardalan became the first Director/Curator of New York City's Swiss Institute in 1987, before moving to Zurich, Switzerland, and then relocating to UK and founding Parasol Unit. She has curated numerous exhibitions and has also lectured and written about art. Prior to her career in art, Ardalan obtained a Ph.D. in physical chemistry.

Funding 
The gallery space is privately owned and has been put at the disposal of the foundation at no charge.

Selected exhibitions
Exhibitions  include The Performance  in 2005 by Michaël Borremans, No Snow on the Broken Bridge in 2006  by Yang Fudong, Momentary Momentum: Animated Drawings with work by Francis Alÿs, William Kentridge, and David Shrigley, Fire Under Snow  in 2008 by Darren Almond, Silent Warriors in 2010 by Adel Abdessemed, The Time That Remains in 2010 by David Claerbout and Morgenland in 2017 by Elger Esser.

Images of the Gallery

See also
 Victoria Miro Gallery located next door

References

External links 
Parasol Unit website
Sotheby's Frieze 2010 video, retrieved 4 December 2010
Time Out website
ArtSlant
Spoonfed
First Thursdays website
Parasol Unit publications at Koenig Books
Parasol Unit publications at Cornerhouse

Contemporary art galleries in London
Art galleries established in 2005
2005 establishments in England
Tourist attractions in the London Borough of Hackney